Boccia at the 2021 Asian Youth Para Games was held in Bahrain between 3 and 4 December 2021.

Medal table

Medalists

Boy

Girl

Mixed

References

External links 
 World Boccia

Sports competitions in Bahrain
2021
2021 in Asian sport
2021 in Bahraini sport
Asian Youth Para Games
Asian Youth Para Games
Asian Youth Para Games
2021 Asian Youth Para Games
Boccia competitions